Lee Hun Chung  (이헌정) (born 1967 in Seoul, South Korea) is a South Korean artist. He is famous for working with ceramics and concrete in a wide range from small objects to large installations.  Lee creates modern day pieces using techniques and colors dating back to the Joseon Dynasty. Lee attended Hong-ik University in Seoul from 1986–1991 with a BFA in ceramic sculpture.  He continued his education throughout San Francisco and Korea, and getting a PH.D in architecture from Kyung-Won University in Gyeonggi-do, South Korea.

Work
 
 SOLO EXHIBITION
 2010  LeeHwaik gallery, Seoul, Korea
 2009  MSU Copeland Gallery, Bozeman, U.S.A
 2009  On the Table, Daegu, Korea
 2008  Seomi & tuus Gallery, Seoul, Korea
 2007  Park Ryu Sook Gallery, JeJu, Korea
 2007  SP Gallery, Seoul, Korea
 2006  U-Ri-Gu-Rut RYU, Seoul, Korea
 2006  Kangha Museum, Yangpeong
 2005  Wong Gallery, Seoul
 2004  Gallery Artside, Seoul, Korea
 2003  Pack Hye Young Gallery, Seoul, Korea
 2002  U-Ri-Gu-Rut RYU, Seoul, Korea
 2001  Wong Gallery, Seoul, Korea
 2001  U-Ri-Gu-Rut RYU, Seoul, Korea
 2000  The Korean Culture ＆ Art Foundation Art Center, Seoul, Korea
 2000  Tokonoma Gallery, Geneva, Switzerland
 2000  U-Ri-Gu-Rut RYU, Seoul, Korea
 1998  Total Museum, Jangheung, Korea
 1997  Tho-Dorang, Seoul, Korea
 1996  Tho-Art Space, Seoul, Korea

SELECTED GROUP EXHIBITION
 2015  Korea now! Design, Craft, Fashion and Graphic Design in Korea exhibition, Musée des Arts décoratifs, Paris, France
 2015 Living In Art II, Connect, Seomi International, Los Angeles, CA, USA
 2015  Living In Art, Seomi International, Los Angeles, CA, USA.
 2014  Korean Contemporary Design: EDWARD TYLER NAHEM FINE ART/ NEW YORK, NY, USA
 2011  Poetry in Clay: Korean Buncheong Ceramics from Leeum, Samsung Museum of Art, The Metropolitan Museum of Art, New York
 2010  Contemporary Korean Design Show, R20th Gallery, New York, U.S.A
 2010  Pagus 21.5, Boutique Monaco Museum, Seoul, Korea
 2010  Design Miami Basel, Miami, U.S.A
 2009  Sulwha cultural exhibition, Kring, Seoul, Korea
 2009  Hongik art/design festival, Hongik Univ. Contemporary Museum, Seoul, Korea
 2009  Design High, Seomi & tuus Gallery, Seoul, Korea
 2009  Design Miami Basel, Basel, Switzerland
 2009  Gyeonggi Annual Project Contemporary Ceramic Art, Gyeonggi Museum of Modern Art, Ansan
 2009  Insa Art Center CLIO 'Cosmetic Jam', Seoul, Korea
 2009  Gallery Idm "The Party with Ceramic" Busan, Korea
 2008  Daegu Textile Art Documenta, Daegu Arts & Culture Center, Daegu, Korea
 2008  Yangpyeong Eco Art Festival_Yangpyeong Project
 2008  The 2nd China Changchun International Sculpture
 2007  Suwon Hwaseong Fortress Theatre Festival, Installation Art, Suwon
 
 2006  Melbourne Art Fair, Royal Exhibition Building, Melbourne 
 Clayarch Gimhae Museum, Gimhae New York S.O.F.A., Regiment Armory, New York
 2005  From Korea Function &Object D'Art, Hillside Terrace, Tokyo,
 World Trade Art Gallery, New York, Mille Plateaux, Paris 
 E-MOMM, E-Wha Womans University A-dong Museum, Seoul
 The Beauty of Korean, Korean Embassy of Venezuela, Venezuela 
 2004  Looking at the Atelier, Insa art center, Seoul
 Sinawi Exhibition, Insa Art Center, Seoul
 2004  International Exchange Exhibition of The Korean Society of Basic Design & Art,
 Kukmin Univ., Seoul
 Melbourne Art Fair, Royal Exhibition Building, Melbourne, Australia 
 2003  San Francisco International Art Exposition, Park-Ryu_Sook Gallery, CA, U.S.A.
 Park-Ryu_Sook Gallery the 20th Anniversary Exhibition, Seoul 
 2002  Melbourne Art Fair, Royal Exhibition Building, Melbourne, Australia 
 Pusan International Art Fair, Bexco, Pusan
 Korean Print Fair, Seoul Arts Center, Seoul
 Korean-Japan craft Exhibition, Sagan Gallery, Seoul
 Artists at Art Fair, Parkryusook Gallery, Seoul
 2001  Horizon of Crafts, Korean Craft Museum, Chongju
 Archie Bray Foundation 50th Anniversary Clay odyssey Invitation Artist Show,
 Archie Bray Center, Montana, U.S.A.
 Ban-Ban, The Richmond Art Center, Richmond, U.S.A 
 The Ware for Gift, U-Ri-Gu-Rut RYU, Seoul, Korea
 Spring Ware, Korean Craft Promotion Foundation, Seoul, Korea 
 Ceramic with Flower, Kumgang Art shop, Daecheon
 The Ware for Spring, U-Ri-Gu-Rut RYU, Seoul, Korea
 2000  Morasai, Sagan Gallery, Seoul, Korea
 The 6th Seoul Print Art Fair, Seoul Metropolitan Museum of Art, Seoul, Korea
 The Rice cake with Vessel, U-Ri-Gu-Rut RYU, Seoul, Korea
 Seoul Living Design Fair, Coex, Seoul
 Melbourne Art Fair, Royal Exhibition Building, Melbourne, Australia 
 Millennium Christmas Exhibition, the makers Gallery, Seoul, Korea
 1999  Wares for The Traditional New Year, Park Ryu Sook Gallery, Seoul, Korea
 Wares for The Spring, Galleria Department Store Oasis Hall, Seoul, Korea
 Ban-Ban, The Korean Culture ＆ Art Foundation Art Center, Seoul, Korea
 Korea and Japan Ceramic Exhibition, NHK Gallery, Osaka, Japan
 Craft Festival-For Weeding, Gana Art Space, Seoul, Korea
 Gift for Full Moon Day, U-Ri-Gu-Rut Ryu, Seoul, Korea 
 International Ceramic Expo. Art Fair, Seoul Art Center, Seoul, Korea
 Bosigi Exhibition, U-Ri-Gu-Rut Ryu, Seoul, Korea 
 The Ware Around Us, Kais Gallery, Seoul, Korea 
 1998  The Exhibition by Hong-Ik ceramic artist Association,
 The Korean Culture ＆ Art Foundation Art Center, Seoul, Korea 
 The Warm ware around Us, Sinsegae Gana Art, Seoul, Korea
 The Wild Flower around Us, Gana Art Space, Seoul, Korea
 The Letter, Gallery Mokumto, Seoul, Korea 
 Korean Ceramic Table-Ware for Dessert, Park Ryu Sook Gallery, Seoul, Korea
 Korean ware, Inter Continental Hotel Lobby, Seoul, Korea
 1997  Spiritual of The Clay, Walkerhill Museum, Seoul, Korea
 Archie Bray Foundation Invitation Artist Show, Archie Bray Center, Montana, U.S.A.
 The Exhibition by Hong-Ik ceramic artist Association, Moonhwa Newspaper Museum, Seoul, Korea 
 Joyful Ceramic, Tho-Art Space, Seoul, Korea 
 The 4th Tho-Ceramic Contest, Hyundai Art Gallery, Seoul, Korea
 1996  Jinro International Ceramic Art Exhibition, Hangaram Museum, Seoul, Korea 
 San Francisco Art Institute M.F.A. Graduate Show, Fort Mason Gallery, San Francisco, U.S.A
 1995  Seoul Contemporary Ceramic Art Biennale, Seoul Metropolitan Museum of art, Seoul, Korea
 1994 San Francisco Art Institute M.F.A. Spring Show, Mabean Gallery, San Francisco, U.S.A
 Korean American Art Festival, Luggage Store Gallery, San Francisco, U.S.A
 1992  25×25×25, Dangong Gallery, Choi Gallery, Karam Culture Center, Seoul. Daegu, Korea
 1991  Oceah, sonamoo Gallery, Seoul, Korea
 Young Artist of The 3rd Gallery, The 3rd Gallery, Seoul, Korea
 1990  Space Behind The Wall, The 3rd Gallery, Seoul, Korea
 
FAIRS
  2015 Design Miami/Basel, Switzerland
  2014 FOG, San Francisco, CA, USA
  2014 Collective, New York City, NY, USA
  2014 The Salon, New York City, NY, USA
  2013  Design Miami/ Basel, Basel Design Days Dubai, Dubai
  2012  Design Miami/, Miami, FL
  2012 PAD, Pavilion of Art & Design, London 
  2012 Design Miami/ Basel, Basel, Switzerland
  2012 Design Days Dubai, Dubai
  2011 Design Miami/, Miami, FL
  2011 Design Miami/ Basel, Basel, Switzerland
  2010 Design Miami/Basel Miami, FL
  2010 Design Miami/ Basel, Switzerland
  2006 Melbourne Art Fair, Royal Exhibition Building, Melbourne
  2004 Melbourne Art Fair, Royal Exhibition Building, Melbourne
  2002 Melbourne Art Fair, Royal Exhibition Building, Melbourne
  2002 Busan International Art Fair, Bexco, Busan 
  2000 Seoul Living Design Fair, Coex, Seoul

 SELECTED COLLECTIONS
 Archie Bray Foundation Center, Montana, USA 
 Boleslawiec Museum, Poland 
 Dae-yoo Culture Foundation, Seoul, Korea
 Haesley Nine Bridge Golf Club, Yeoju, Korea
 Jinro Foundation of Culture, Seoul, Korea 
 Kyung Duk Jin University Museum, China 
 Niagara Gallery, Melbourne, Australia National Museum of Contemporary Art,
 National Museum of Modern and Contemporary Art, Korea, Seoul, Korea

References

External links
 Official Website 

South Korean artists
People from Seoul
Artists from Seoul
1967 births
Living people